Union School District was a school district headquartered in unincorporated Union County, Arkansas, near El Dorado. Its mascot was the cyclone.

On July 1, 2004, it merged into the El Dorado School District.

References

External links
 

School districts disestablished in 2004
2004 disestablishments in Arkansas
Defunct school districts in Arkansas
Education in Union County, Arkansas